Michele Brekke is a former flight director in NASA Johnson Space Center (JSC) Space Shuttle Mission Control Center. She is notable for having been the first female NASA flight director. She served as Manager, Visiting Vehicle Operations Integration, Transportation Integration Office at JSC. She retired from JSC in 2014 after 37 years of service. She currently holds the position of flight director for the Boeing CST-100 Starliner operational missions.

Early life 
Brekke received a bachelor's degree in aerospace engineering from the University of Minnesota in 1975. She continued her studies at the University of Minnesota and received her master's degree in aerospace engineering in 1977, while working part time at Honeywell as a computer programmer. While at the University of Minnesota, Brekke was a volleyball letter winner.

Career

Space Shuttle payloads and mission operations
Brekke was hired as an astronaut instructor by JSC soon after she completed a master's degree in aerospace engineering at the University of Minnesota in 1977. She applied for an astronaut position but was not selected. After five years she began work as a payload officer in Mission Control. As a payload officer, she coordinated activities between NASA and its payload customers who wanted satellites launched or cargo taken into orbit. In 1985 Brekke was selected to join the flight director office, the first female to achieve this distinction. Brekke also served as a project manager for Common Communications for Visiting Vehicles (C2V2) where she developed hardware enabling visiting spacecraft to communicate with the ISS upon approach. She also held the position of associate chief of the Space Medicine and Health Care Systems Office.

Space Shuttle Flight Manager
As a Flight Manager, Brekke was responsible for the day-to-day decisions regarding mission design, operations and integration. This typically began about a year and a half prior to launch. Following launch, during the mission, she was a member of the Mission Management Team. As such, she reported on daily progress and accomplishments of payload/cargo operations.

Manager, Customer and Flight Integration
Brekke performed operations and integration for Space Shuttle missions.

NASA Loaned Executive to Houston Technology Center
Brekke's position was as a "business accelerator" for technology start-ups.

Director, Innovation Partnerships and Technology Transfer
Brekke facilitated partnership development through Space Act Agreements and patent licensing.

Manager, Visiting Vehicle Operations Integration
Brekke was responsible for operations integration for vehicles visiting the International Space Station (ISS).

Career at Boeing
After 37 years at NASA, Brekke retired and took a position at Boeing where she is helping to develop commercial aircraft to carry astronauts to the ISS. Brekke currently serves as a flight manager for the Boeing CST-100 Starliner.

Awards and honors
In 1985, Brekke was named one of America's 100 outstanding young women by Good Housekeeping magazine. In 2007 Brekke received a Leadership in Technology Award from the Houston Chapter of the Association for Women in Computing (AWC). On October 4, 2019, Brekke served as the University of Minnesota Homecoming Grand Marshal. Brekke is also a recipient of the NASA Exceptional Achievement Award.

References

External links
Alumni newspaper article
LinkedIn profile

Year of birth missing (living people)
Living people
NASA flight controllers
University of Minnesota College of Science and Engineering alumni